Honesty is the debut studio album by American country music artist Rodney Atkins. It was released on October 14, 2003 by Curb Records.

Honesty produced four chart singles on the Billboard Hot Country Singles & Tracks (now Hot Country Songs) charts with "Sing Along" (No. 36), "My Old Man" (No. 37), "Honesty (Write Me a List)" (No. 4), and "Someone to Share It With" (No. 41). The album's fifth single, "Monkey in the Middle", failed to chart. This song and two others on the album were co-written by Brian Gowan, who recorded on Curb in 1997 in the duo Blake & Brian.

Track listing

Personnel
Walt Aldridge- bouzouki
Rodney Atkins- loop programming, lead vocals, background vocals
Bekka Bramlett- background vocals
Mike Brignardello- bass guitar
Shannon Forrest- drums
Bruce Gaitsch- bass guitar, acoustic guitar, electric guitar
Sonny Garrish- steel guitar
Mark Gillespie- acoustic guitar, gut string guitar, mandolin
Ted Hewitt- acoustic guitar, electric guitar, loop programming, electric sitar, background vocals
Wes Hightower- background vocals
B. James Lowry- acoustic guitar, electric guitar
Brent Mason- electric guitar
Chris McHugh- drums, loop programming
Gene Miller- background vocals
Greg Morrow- drums
Gordon Mote- Farfisa organ, keyboards
Steve Nathan- keyboards, piano, Wurlitzer
Justin Niebank- loop programming
Kim Parent- background vocals
Scotty Sanders- steel guitar, lap steel guitar
Hank Singer- fiddle
Russell Terrell- background vocals
John Willis- acoustic guitar
Lonnie Wilson- drums
Jonathan Yudkin- bouzouki, fiddle, orchestra bells

Chart performance

Album

Singles

References

2003 debut albums
Rodney Atkins albums
Curb Records albums